A Touch of the Sun may refer to:

 A Touch of the Sun (1956 film)
 A Touch of the Sun (1963 TV Movie)
 A Touch of the Sun (1979 film)
 A Touch of the Sun (play), a 1958 play by N.C. Hunter